The Oppenheimer Diamond, a nearly perfectly formed  yellow diamond crystal, is one of the largest uncut diamonds in the world, and measures approximately 20 × 20 millimeters. It was discovered in the Dutoitspan Mine, Kimberley, South Africa, in 1964. Harry Winston acquired the stone and presented it to the Smithsonian Institution in memory of Sir Ernest Oppenheimer.

See also
 List of diamonds

References

External links

Oppenheimer Diamond at the Smithsonian, with better closeup photos
Another view
Third closeup

Oppenheimer family
Jewellery in the collection of the Smithsonian Institution
Diamonds originating in South Africa
1964 in South Africa
Yellow diamonds
Individual diamonds